Marek Uram (born September 8, 1974) is a Slovak ice hockey player, currently playing for MHk 32 Liptovský Mikuláš.

Uram started his hockey career in his hometown Liptovský Mikuláš, where he played for the local club HK 32. In the 1999/00 season he got traded to the Czech Extraliga, he ended up in the team HC Znojmo along fellow Slovak center Peter Pucher. During his career in Znojmo he was of the team's best scorers. In a disappointing 2005/06 season Uram got traded to HC Vítkovice. After the end of that season he signed a contract with HC Slovan Bratislava and won two Slovak Extraliga titles there.

Uram represented Slovakia at the 2002 World Championships, where Slovakia won a gold medal.

Career statistics

Regular season and playoffs

International

External links

1974 births
Living people
Slovak ice hockey left wingers
Sportspeople from Liptovský Mikuláš
MHk 32 Liptovský Mikuláš players
HC Nové Zámky players
ŠHK 37 Piešťany players
HC Slovan Bratislava players
HC Vítkovice players
MsHK Žilina players
Orli Znojmo players
MHC Martin players
Slovak expatriate ice hockey players in the Czech Republic